Charline Patricia Effah (born 1977) is a Gabonese writer and educator living in Paris.

The daughter of a lawyer and a school teacher, she was born in Minvoul and grew up in Libreville. She took part in theatre at Théâtre Express there. A story "La prière du petit Maquisard" received an award in a contest for young authors. In the same year, her poem "Eldorado" won a contest sponsored by the  program Le cœur et la Plume. She obtained a master's degree in Modern Literature in 2000 and then earned a doctorate at the University of Lille in 2008. She is working as a teacher in Paris.

In 2015, she received the award of merit for literature at the Nuit des Mérites Africain.

Selected works 
 Percées et chimères, novel (2011)
 N'être, novel (2014)

References 

1977 births
Living people
Gabonese women writers
Gabonese novelists
21st-century Gabonese people